Logan Currie (born 24 June 2001) is a New Zealand road cyclist, who currently rides for UCI ProTeam .

Major results

2019
 1st  Time trial, National Junior Road Championships
 7th Johan Museeuw Classic
2020
 3rd Time trial, National Under-23 Road Championships
 8th Overall Tour of Southland
2021
 2nd Time trial, National Under-23 Road Championships
 3rd Overall Tour of Southland
1st Prologue (TTT)
 3rd Stadprijs Geraardsbergen
2022
 1st  Time trial, Oceania Under-23 Road Championships
 1st  Time trial, National Under-23 Road Championships
 1st Stage 1 (TTT) New Zealand Cycle Classic
 4th Time trial, UCI Under-23 Road World Championships
 4th Overall Tour de la Mirabelle
1st  Young rider classification
 9th Overall Course de Solidarność et des Champions Olympiques
1st  Young rider classification

References

External links
 

2001 births
Living people
New Zealand male cyclists
Sportspeople from Ashburton, New Zealand